Professor Thomas Maxwell Harris FRS (8 January 1903 – 1 May 1983) was an English paleobotanist.

Education and career
He was educated at Bootham School, York, Wyggeston School, Leicester, and University College, Nottingham, before continuing to complete his doctorate at Christ's College, Cambridge.

Tom Harris became a professor at the University of Reading in 1934, working in the botany department with Theodora Lisle Prankerd and Terrance Ingold. He was Head of the Department of Botany. At Reading he supervised William Chaloner and Winifred Pennington, both later professors of botany. The Harris Garden, located on the University of Reading's Whiteknights Campus, was named after him.

Harris was a Fellow of the Royal Society. He served as president of the Linnean Society of London from 1961 to 1964.

Awards 
1968 Linnean Medal

Partial bibliography 
 The Fossil Flora of Scoresby Sound East Greenland (Copenhagen, 1931).
 The British Rhaetic Flora (London, 1938).
 British Purbeck Charophyta (London, 1939).
 Liassic and Rhaetic Plants collected in 1936-38 from East Greenland, etc. (Copenhagen, 1946).
 Conifers of the Taxiodiaceæ from the Wealden Formation of Belgium, etc. (Brussels, 1953).
 The Yorkshire Jurassic flora (five volumes, London, 1961–1979).

References 

1903 births
1983 deaths
British palaeontologists
Paleobotanists
20th-century British botanists
People educated at Bootham School
People educated at Wyggeston Grammar School for Boys
Alumni of the University of Nottingham
Alumni of Christ's College, Cambridge
Academics of the University of Reading
Fellows of the Royal Society
Members of the Royal Swedish Academy of Sciences